Edgar Allan Jonas (October 14, 1885 – November 14, 1965) was a U.S. Representative from Illinois.

Born in Mishicot, Wisconsin, Jonas attended the public schools and graduated from the Manitowoc County Normal School.
He taught in the rural schools of Manitowoc County 1903–1907.
He was graduated from the University of Chicago Law School in June 1910.
He was admitted to the bar in 1909 and commenced the practice of law in Chicago, Illinois.
He served as assistant corporation counsel of Chicago, Illinois, in 1919 and 1920.
First assistant State's attorney of Cook County, Illinois from 1921 to 1923.
He served as a judge of the Municipal Court of Chicago 1923–1937.
He served as a judge of the Superior Court of Cook County in 1941 and 1942.
He served as an associate member of Board of Pardons and Paroles of Illinois 1945–1947.
He served as a delegate to the Republican National Convention in 1948.

In 1921, Jonas had run successfully as a Republican nominee for the Circuit Court of Cook County.

Jonas was elected as a Republican to the Eighty-first, Eighty-second, and Eighty-third Congresses (January 3, 1949 – January 3, 1955).
He was an unsuccessful candidate for reelection in 1954 to the Eighty-fourth Congress and for election in 1956 to the Eighty-fifth Congress.
He resumed the practice of law and was a resident of Chicago, Illinois.
He died in Evanston, Illinois, November 14, 1965.
He was interred in Rosehill Cemetery in Chicago.

References

1885 births
1965 deaths
Burials at Rosehill Cemetery
Illinois state court judges
People from Mishicot, Wisconsin
Politicians from Chicago
University of Chicago Law School alumni
Republican Party members of the United States House of Representatives from Illinois
20th-century American judges
Judges of the Superior Court of Cook County
20th-century American politicians